Chris Guccione and Artem Sitak were the defending champions but chose not to defend their title.

Nicolaas Scholtz and Tucker Vorster won the title after defeating Mackenzie McDonald and Ben McLachlan 6–7(5–7), 6–3, [10–8] in the final.

Seeds

Draw

References
 Main Draw

Nordic Naturals Challenger - Doubles
2016 Doubles